Suttles is a surname. Notable people with the surname include:

Duncan Suttles (born 1945), Canadian chess player
Gerald D. Suttles (1932–2017), American sociologist 
Mule Suttles (1900–1966), American baseball player
Wayne Suttles (1918–2005), American anthropologist and linguist
Morrell E. Suttles (1938-2017), American entrepreneur and racecar driver

See also 
Suttle